Collection is a 1985 half official double compilation album from Swedish pop and rock artist Magnus Uggla. The album was released for the Finnish market.

Track listing

A
 IQ
 Jazzgossen
 Raggarna
 Mälarö kyrka
 Vi möttes bara för en kväll
 Astrologen

B
 Varning på stan
 Barn av sin stad
 Just den där
 Centrumhets (Metro Jets)

C
 Sommartid
 Asfaltbarn
 Vår tid 1977
 Rock’n roll revolution
 Hjärtekrossare

D
 Bobbo Viking
 Lena
 Ja just du ska va gla
 Draget
 Panik

References

External links

1986 compilation albums
Magnus Uggla compilation albums
Swedish-language compilation albums